Rae Ingram (born 6 December 1974) is an English former professional footballer and sports masseur.

As a player, he was a defender, who played 152 league games in a ten-year career in the English Football League and Premier League. He began his career at Manchester City in July 1993, and made 21 appearances over the next five years. He was loaned out to Macclesfield Town in March 1993, and helped the "Silkmen" to promotion out of the Third Division in 1997–98. He joined the club permanently in July 1998, before he moved on to Port Vale in June 2001. He left Vale Park in May 2003, and spent one season in the Welsh Premier League with Bangor City, before announcing his retirement. After retiring as a player he became a fireman and also worked as a sports masseur at Macclesfield Town.

Career
Ingram started his career at Manchester City, signing professional forms at Maine Road in July 1993 under Brian Horton's stewardship. After battles against relegation in 1993–94 and 1994–95, the "Sky Blues" lost their Premier League status in 1995–96 under Alan Ball. Ingram made his debut on 30 August 1995, in a 2–0 home defeat to Everton, and played four further top-flight games during the campaign. A centre-half, he was forced to play out of position at left-back due to a lack of specialist full-backs at the club. He featured 22 times in 1996–97, finding a first team place from January onwards under new boss Frank Clark (who replaced short-term appointment Steve Coppell). He fell out of the first team picture though in 1997–98, and finished the season on loan at Macclesfield Town, after recovering from a bout of ME. He made five league appearances for Sammy McIlroy's "Silkmen", helping the club to finish as runners-up of the Third Division, and went to Moss Rose permanently in July 1998 on a free transfer. Ingram made 34 appearances, but could not prevent the club from finishing bottom of the Second Division in 1998–99. He played 39 times in 1999–2000 and 36 times in 2000–01. He scored his first and only senior goal on 14 October 2000, in a 2–1 home win over Cheltenham Town.

He signed with Port Vale in June 2001, in a move that reunited him with former boss Brian Horton. He featured 28 times in 2001–02, having lost his first team place at Vale Park by December 2001. He could only play four games in 2002–03, as he contracted meningitis in January 2003; after doctors confirmed it was the non-lethal strain he was released from hospital. He was released by new manager Martin Foyle in May 2003, and subsequently signed for Welsh Premier League outfit Bangor City, who were managed by his former teammate Peter Davenport. He left Bangor at the end of the 2003–04 season, after making fourteen league appearances, and went into retirement.

Personal life
After retiring as a player, Ingram worked as a firefighter in Sale, Greater Manchester. He also worked as a masseur at Macclesfield Town from 2013.

Career statistics
Source:

Honours
Macclesfield Town
Football League Third Division second-place promotion: 1997–98

References

1974 births
Living people
Footballers from Manchester
English footballers
Association football defenders
Manchester City F.C. players
Macclesfield Town F.C. players
Port Vale F.C. players
Bangor City F.C. players
Premier League players
English Football League players
Cymru Premier players
British firefighters
Macclesfield Town F.C. non-playing staff